Smokin' O.P.'s is the fifth studio album by American rock singer-songwriter Bob Seger, released in 1972 (see 1972 in music).  The album was reissued on CD by Capitol Records in 2005.  It is currently the earliest Bob Seger album available on CD. The cover art is a parody of the Lucky Strike cigarette logo. Smokin' O.P.'s refers to Smokin' Other People's Songs, a derivation on the slang phrase "Smoking O.P.'s" meaning to smoke other people's cigarettes exclusively (never purchasing your own for consumption).  Most of the tracks on this release are covers of songs written by other artists.

The album cover was created by Thomas Leroy Weschler, who was Seger's road manager at the time. The cover was inspired by an advertisement for Lucky Strike cigarettes.  Tom Weschler also went on to co-write Traveling Man: On the Road & Behind the Scenes with Bob Seger.

"If I Were a Carpenter" and "Hummin' Bird" were recorded and mixed at RCA Studios, Toronto, Canada.

Track listing

Personnel
Bob Seger – guitar on "If I Were a Carpenter" and "Jesse James", piano on "Someday", vocals
Jack Ashford – percussion, tambourine
Eddie "Bongo" Brown – percussion, conga
Mike Bruce – guitar
Jim Bruzzese – tambourine on "If I Were a Carpenter"
Chrystal Jenkins and Pam Todd – vocals on "Hummin' Bird" and "Jesse James"
Skip Knapé – organ, keyboards, bass pedals; piano on "Hummin' Bird"
David Teegarden – drums, maracas, marimba
Al Yungton - string arrangement on "Someday"

Production
Producer: Punch Andrews
Engineer: Jim Bruzzese
Assistant engineer: Greg Miller
Mixing: Jim Cassily, Mabel Louise Smith, Thomas Weschler
Photography: Thomas Weschler, Peter Lumetta
Cover Design: Thomas Weschler

Charts
Album – Billboard (United States)

Singles – Billboard (United States)

References

1972 albums
Albums produced by Punch Andrews
Bob Seger albums
Covers albums
Reprise Records albums